A trap line is used by some orb weaver spiders as a mechanism to alert them of a newly captured prey in their web. 

They spin a line of silk and attach it to the center of the web. The spider then stays near it and waits for their prey, most likely a small insect such as a fly or mosquito, to stick to their web. The prey lands in the web and vibrates the line. The alerted spider then travels to the prey and makes preparations to eat it.

Notes and references

Spiders